Bardarash-e Olya (also Romanized as Bardarash-e ‘Olyā; also known as Badarash-e Bālā) is a village in Aland Rural District, Safayyeh District, Khoy County, West Azerbaijan Province, Iran. At the 2006 census, its population was 471, in 87 families.

References 

Populated places in Khoy County